Frank Seymour (14 May 1904 – 7 May 1987) was an Australian rules footballer who played with Carlton and  Fitzroy in the VFL and Northcote in the VFA.

Family
The son of unmarried mother Florence Bassett, Frank Seymour Bassett was born at Carlton on 14 May 1904. He later dropped the Bassett name and was known as Frank Seymour.

Seymour married Lilian May Fraser (1904–1979) in Albury in 1927.

Football
Seymour was a full-forward and was recruited from New South Wales to join Carlton in the 1927 season. After two seasons with Carlton, he moved to Northcote where he became a prolific goalkicker, and topped the VFA's goal kicking with over 100 goals in three separate seasons; 1930 - 110, 1932 - 109 (122), 1934 - 122 goals

He played 201 games for the club, and was one of three players to play in all five of Northcote's top division premiership teams (1929, 1932, 1933, 1934 and 1936). His career tally of 880 goals was the Northcote record when the club folded in 1987, and was a VFA record until 1962 when it was broken by Bob Bonnett.

References

External links

1904 births
Australian rules footballers from New South Wales
Carlton Football Club players
Fitzroy Football Club players
Northcote Football Club players
1987 deaths
Place of birth missing
People from Carlton, Victoria
Australian rules footballers from Melbourne